Inside Looking Out is a 1977 Australian film directed by Paul Cox. It was his second feature film.

Plot
The marriage of Robert and Elizabeth is collapsing, both concentrating on their jobs (journalist, mother) rather than each other. The film looks at a week in their lives. Robert sleeps with their babysitter, Marianne, while Elizabeth talks with their friends, Juliet and Alex.

Cast
Briony Behets as Elizabeth
Tony Llewellyn-Jones as Robert
Norman Kaye as Alex
Elke Neidhardt as Marianne
Juliet Bascskai as Juliet
Dani Eddy as Dani
Jean Campbell as neighbour

Production
Cox wanted to make a film that was less autobiographical than his previous work, so brought in a co-writer, Susan Holly-Jones. Tony Llewellyn-Jones and Bernard Eddy also contributed to the shooting script.

The movie was shot over three weeks on 35mm at the beginning of 1977 under the working title Two in the Family. The Creative Development Branch of the Australian Film Commission invested $33,000 with the rest coming from private investment, including Cox and Llewellyn-Jones.

Release
The film screened at the Sydney and Melbourne Film Festivals in June 1977 before receiving a limited release.

References

External links

Inside Looking Out at Oz Movies

1977 films
Australian drama films
Films directed by Paul Cox
1970s English-language films
1970s Australian films